DCS may refer to:

Government
 Danish Council of State, the privy council of Denmark
 Defense Clandestine Service, a component of the U.S. Defense Intelligence Agency
 Department of Child Safety (or Services)]], or Child protective services, the name for an agency asked with protecting children from violence, exploitation, abuse, and neglect
 Deputy Chief of Staff (DCS), as in:
 Deputy Chief of the Air Staff (disambiguation)
 Deputy Chief of the Defence Staff
 White House Deputy Chief of Staff
 Diplomatic Courier Service, a branch of the US Bureau of Diplomatic Security tasked with protecting diplomatic pouches and material
 Directorate of Colonial Surveys, the United Kingdom's central survey and mapping organisation for British colonies and protectorates 1946–1957
 Dutch Council of State, a constitutionally-established advisory body to the government of the Netherlands

Law enforcement 
 Department of Corrective Services, department of New South Wales Government responsible for supervision of adult offenders on community-based or custodial orders
 Detective Chief Superintendent, the senior detective and commander of the Criminal Investigation Department in most forces in the United Kingdom
 Georgia Department of Community Supervision, the executive branch agency of the U.S. state of Georgia tasked with the supervision of felony probationers and parolees

Education
 Dade Christian School, a private school in Miami-Dade County, Florida
 Dayton City School, a school district and elementary/middle school in Dayton, Tennessee
 Dean Close School
 Desert Christian Schools (Arizona), in Tucson, Arizona
 Desert Christian Schools (California), a private school in Lancaster, California
 Diploma of Collegial Studies, a certificate awarded for completion of pre-university studies in the province of Québec, Canada
 Doctors Charter School of Miami Shores, a High/Middle Charter School located in Miami Shores, Florida

Medicine
 D-cycloserine a GABA transaminase inhibitor and an antibiotic
 Decompression sickness, symptoms suffered by a person exposed to a reduction in the pressure surrounding their body
 Dendritic cells, a type of antigen presenting cell of immunologic function
 Dorsal Column Stimulator, an implantable medical device used to treat chronic pain of neurologic origin
 Damage control surgery, a form of surgery which is used in cases of severe trauma
 Delusional companion syndrome, a psychological neuropathology of the self

Technology
 Data Coding Scheme is a field in SMS and CB messages which carries information about message encoding
 Dark current spectroscopy, a technique used to find contaminants in silicon
 Departure control system, airline computer systems responsible for passenger and bag processing activities
 Desktop Color Separations, an enhanced EPS file format
 Device Control String, hex 90 in the C1 set of control codes
 Dichlorosilane, SiH2Cl2, used in microelectronic wafer processing
 Digital Cellular System, a mobile communications-based PCS network used outside of the U.S.
 Digital Command System, a model railroad system by MTH Electric Trains
 Digital Compression System, a sound system developed by Williams Electronics
 Digital cross connect system, a type of telecom equipment
 Digital-Coded Squelch, a squelch that superimposes a continuous stream of FSK digital data on the transmitted signal
 Distributed control system, a control system in which the controller elements are not central in location but are distributed throughout the system
 Dwight Cavendish Systems, a manufacturer of video copy protection
 Form D Control System, a subset of the Northeast Operating Rules Advisory Committee operating rules for railroads
 Kodak DCS, a series of professional digital single-lens reflex cameras
 Dry Combat Submersible, a military submarine being developed for use by the United States Navy

Entertainment
 Dead Celebrity Status, a Canadian rap rock group
 Desi Culture Shock, a UK Bhangra group
 Digital Combat Simulator, a combat flight simulator developed by Eagle Dynamics

Other
 Deacon (Church of Scotland), postnominal for a deaconess or deacon of the Church of Scotland
 Deaf Children's Society, a British charity for deaf people and their families
 Dynamic Cooking Systems, now a unit of Fisher & Paykel